Hedychridium is a genus of insects belonging to the family Chrysididae.

Species:
 Hedychridium adventicium
 Hedychridium aereolum
 Hedychridium aheneum

References

Chrysididae
Hymenoptera genera